Violeta Bulc (born 24 January 1964) is a Slovenian politician who served as the European Commissioner for Transport from 2014 to 2019.

Early life

Bulc earned a bachelor's degree in computer science and informatics at the Faculty of Electrical Engineering, University of Ljubljana, Slovenia, as well as a master's degree in information technology at the Golden Gate University of San Francisco. She then worked from 1991 to 1994 as an expert for wide area networks performance analyses at DHL in Burlingame, California. In 1994 she returned to Slovenia, where she worked as the manager of institutional traffic (until 1997) and then the director of carrier business (until 1999) for Telekom Slovenia. From 1999 to 2000 she was the vice-president of Telemach, a major telecommunications provider, and from 2000 to 2014 the CEO of Vibacom, Sustainable Strategies and Innovation Ecosystems.

Politics

Bulc joined Slovenian politics together with Miro Cerar in 2013, and she was appointed head of the program committee of the Miro Cerar Party.

Bulc served as a minister without portfolio responsible for development, strategic projects and cohesion and as deputy prime minister from 19 September 2014 until 1 November 2014 in the centre-left cabinet of Miro Cerar.

Other activities 

Starting from 2022, she became a board member of the Joint European Disruptive Initiative.

Critique over esotericism

On 10 October 2014, the Slovenian government announced that Bulc would be Slovenia's nominee for the position of the European Commissioner on the Juncker Commission, replacing Alenka Bratušek. 
Bulc was criticized because of her esoteric views, including necromancy.
After a confirmation hearing in front of the European Parliament's Committee on Transport and Tourism, Bulc was assigned the transport portfolio.

References

External links

|-

1964 births
Golden Gate University alumni
Living people
Modern Centre Party politicians
Politicians from Ljubljana
Slovenian European Commissioners
University of Ljubljana alumni
Women European Commissioners
Women government ministers of Slovenia
European Commissioners 2014–2019
21st-century Slovenian women politicians
21st-century Slovenian politicians
Deputy Prime Ministers of Slovenia